Niki and Sammy Albon (born 20 February 1992) are twins, British YouTube personalities, radio presenters and digital creators.

Background
Niki and Sammy are from Canvey Island in Essex. They graduated from Roehampton University. Niki has a bachelor's degree in History and Journalism, and Sammy has a bachelor's degree in Classical Civilisation.

Niki came out as gay in 2020.

Careers

YouTube 
The pair launched the Niki 'n' Sammy YouTube channel in June 2013. , the channel has 184,000 subscribers. After losing a combined 16 stone (101 kg), they were interviewed on Irish radio and Australian television.

In January 2019, they relaunched their YouTube career with a new channel called TTK (Twins Talk Kpop.) The channel features content discussing Kpop in the UK, a niche they occupied after the popularity of Kpop episodes from the Peachy Podcast.

Hosting 
They have hosted the CBBC Official Chart Show, a BBC Radio 1 programme, and are an Anti-Bullying Ambassador. They were backstage hosts at the 2016 BBC Music Awards. In 2018, they hosted the BRIT Awards Social Squad. In the same year, they also hosted Girl Guides Gig at Wembley Arena twice. During the 2015 United Kingdom general election, the twins interviewed Labour leader Ed Miliband.

Advocacy 
From 2015 to 2018, Niki and Sammy were the main hosts for the Stand Up to Cancer UK charity live stream on YouTube. The twins also rowed 27 miles as part of Stand Up to Cancer's Great Canoe Challenge.

The Peachy Podcast

Niki and Sammy's Peachy Podcast is a British podcast which airs on BBC Radio 1 on Mondays. The first series ran between 19 February 2018 and 7 May 2018, the series was successful and featured interviews with a number of high-profile guests including Steve Aoki, Monsta X, and Tiffany Young.

References

External links
 
 Niki and Sammy's Peachy Podcast  site.
 Niki and Sammy YouTube channel.

1992 births
20th-century British LGBT people
21st-century LGBT people
Living people
People from Canvey Island
Alumni of the University of Roehampton
British Internet celebrities
BBC Radio 1 presenters
English YouTubers
English video bloggers
LGBT YouTubers
Sibling duos